Politischer Arbeiter-Zirkel  (Political Workers' Circle) was a political activist group founded by Karl Harrer, a known nationalist, in hopes of gathering intellectuals to discuss the political future of Germany in March 1918. The organization eventually merged with the Workers' Committee for a Good Peace formed by Anton Drexler to become the German Workers' Party in January 1919. Ultimately these principles would develop into the National Socialist German Workers Party (Nationalsozialistische Deutsche Arbeiterpartei; NSDAP), also known as the Nazi Party.

Background
Germany's defeat in World War I forced them to take complete responsibility for the war, completely humiliating the German people. Additionally, the stab-in-the-back myth or the idea that Germany was actually winning the war and was undermined by domestic revolutions, emerged and added anger to the equation. The Thule Society, an organization encompassing people from all classes centered around hopes for a counterrevolution, emerged as a result of German humiliation and anger and attempted to fill the gap felt by Germans that the Weimar Republic was “out of touch,” with lower classes.

The society approached Karl Harrer, a member and sports reporter for the right-wing publication Münchner-Augsburger Abendzeitung, to start a political activist group in Munich. The hope was to collect discuss critical German principles, namely nationalism and anti-Semitism.

Ideology
Politischer Arbeiter-Zirkel met periodically for about a year, generally in a small group of three to seven consistent members. Members shared a similar and traditional outlook as highly nationalist, anti-Marxist and anti-Semitic. They also discussed emerging ideas of the time such as Jews as the enemy to Germany, various aspects of the defeat of World War I, and anti-English sentiment, generally thought to be brought on by the Treaty of Versailles. During the meetings Harrer lead the group in studying the Russian Revolution in hopes of finding an escape for Germany.

Future of the Club
Anton Drexler met Karl Harrer at a Rightist rally in Wagner Hall in Munich in 1918. Harrer was impressed with Drexler's desire to have citizen representation in the political sphere and Drexler began attending meetings. Drexler was the leader of his own political group known as the Workers' Committee for a Good Peace, consisting mostly of Drexler's railway coworkers. The Workers' Committee was united under beliefs that international capitalists, considered to be Jews, and Marxists were the enemy.

While Harrer believed there was something to be said for keeping the Politischer Arbeiter-Zirkel small and secretive, Drexler wanted to have a bigger audience and work on the spread of his ideals. Drexler wanted to make it a political party. Ultimately, Drexler proposed the creation of the German Workers' Party. With the uniting of the Politischer Arbeiter-Zirkel with the Workers' Committee, the German Workers' Party (Deutsche Arbeiterpartei; DAP) was founded. Besides Drexler and Harrer, founding members included Gottfried Feder and Dietrich Eckart. It met for the first time on January 5, 1919, in the hotel Fürstenfelder Hof in Munich. Drexler's vision for the party increasingly came into conflict with Harrer's. Harrer wished to ensure that an elite 'inner circle' remained in control of the party, while Drexler wanted to expand it into a mass movement. When Adolf Hitler joined the party, Drexler's position was strengthened. Hitler and Drexler worked on a new constitution to marginalise the role of the Politischer Arbeiter-Zirkel. Harrer was outvoted, and resigned from the party. The DAP was renamed the National Socialist German Workers' Party (Nationalsozialistische Deutsche Arbeiterpartei; NSDAP) on February 24, 1920.

Notes

References
Goodrick-Clarke, Nicholas (2004). The Occult Roots of Nazism: Secret Aryan Cults and Their Influence on Nazi Ideology, London: Tauris Parke.
Heinz, Heinz A. (2014) Hitler: Personal Recollections: Memoirs From Those Who Knew Him. Pen and Sword Books
Horne, John; Kramer, Alan (2001). German Atrocities, 1914: A History of Denial, Yale University Press.

Luhrssen, David (2012). "Thule and the Nazi Circle" in Hammer of the Gods: The Thule Society and the Birth of Nazism. Washington, D.C.: Potomac Books.
Spector, Robert M. (2005). World without Civilization: Mass Murder and the Holocaust, History and Analysis, Lanham, MD: University Press of America.

1918 establishments in Germany
1919 disestablishments in Germany
Adolf Hitler
Far-right politics in Germany
German nationalist organizations
Organizations based in the Weimar Republic
Organizations disestablished in 1919
Organizations established in 1918
Pan-Germanism
Politics of the Weimar Republic